Alfred John Hubbard (23 May 1902 – 1976) was managing director of the printers Perkins Bacon & Co. He was also master of The Stationers' Company.

Hubbard was a philatelist who became president of the Royal Philatelic Society for the years 1970–73. He was added to the Roll of Distinguished Philatelists in 1973.

References

Signatories to the Roll of Distinguished Philatelists
1902 births
1976 deaths
British philatelists
Presidents of the Royal Philatelic Society London
20th-century British businesspeople